Youssef Makkar (born 8 July 1988) is an Egyptian sports shooter. He competed in the men's 10 metre air rifle event at the 2020 Summer Olympics.

References

External links
 

1988 births
Living people
Egyptian male sport shooters
Olympic shooters of Egypt
Shooters at the 2020 Summer Olympics
Sportspeople from Cairo